Menopause, also known as the climacteric, is the time in women's lives when menstrual periods stop permanently, and they are no longer able to bear children. The age of menopause varies but it usually occurs between 45 and 55. Medical professionals often define menopause as having occurred when a woman has not had any menstrual bleeding for a year. It may also be defined by a decrease in hormone production by the ovaries. In those who have had surgery to remove their uterus but still have functioning ovaries, menopause is not considered to have yet occurred. Following the removal of the uterus, symptoms of menopause typically occur earlier.

In the years before menopause, a woman's periods typically become irregular, which means that periods may be longer or shorter in duration or be lighter or heavier in the amount of flow. During this time, women often experience hot flashes; these typically last from 30 seconds to ten minutes and may be associated with shivering, sweating, and reddening of the skin. Hot flashes can recur for four to five years. Other symptoms may include vaginal dryness, trouble sleeping, and mood changes. The severity of symptoms varies between women.
Menopause before the age of 45 years is considered to be "early menopause" and when ovarian failure/surgical removal of the ovaries occurs before the age of 40 years this is termed "premature ovarian insufficiency".

In addition to symptoms (hot flushes/flashes, night sweats, mood changes, arthralgia and vaginal dryness), the physical consequences of menopause include bone loss, increased central abdominal fat, and adverse changes in a woman's cholesterol profile and vascular function. These changes predispose postmenopausal women to increased risks of osteoporosis and bone fracture, and of cardio-metabolic disease (diabetes and cardiovascular disease).

Menopause is usually a natural change. It can occur earlier in those who smoke tobacco. Other causes include surgery that removes both ovaries or some types of chemotherapy. At the physiological level, menopause happens because of a decrease in the ovaries' production of the hormones estrogen and progesterone. While typically not needed, a diagnosis of menopause can be confirmed by measuring hormone levels in the blood or urine. Menopause is the opposite of menarche, the time when a girl's periods start.

The primary indications for treatment of menopause are symptoms and prevention of bone loss. Mild symptoms may be improved with treatment. With respect to hot flashes, avoiding smoking, caffeine, and alcohol is often recommended; sleeping naked in a cool room and using a fan may help. The most effective treatment for menopausal symptoms is menopausal hormone therapy (MHT). Non hormonal therapies for hot flashes include clonidine, gabapentin, or selective serotonin reuptake inhibitors. These will not improve symptoms such as joint pain or vaginal dryness which affect over 55% of women. Exercise may help with sleeping problems. Many of the concerns about the use of MHT raised by older studies are no longer considered barriers to MHT in healthy women. High-quality evidence for the effectiveness of alternative medicine has not been found. There is tentative evidence for the use of phytoestrogens for symptomatic treatment.

Signs and symptoms

During early menopause transition, the menstrual cycles remain regular but the interval between cycles begins to lengthen. Hormone levels begin to fluctuate. Ovulation may not occur with each cycle.

The term menopause refers to a point in time that follows one year after the last menstruation. During the menopausal transition and after menopause, women can experience a wide range of symptoms. However, for women who enter the menopause transition without having regular menstrual cycles (due to prior surgery, other medical conditions or ongoing hormonal contraception) the menopause cannot be identified by bleeding patterns and is defined as the permanent loss of ovarian function.

Vagina and uterus

During the transition to menopause, menstrual patterns can show shorter cycling (by 2–7 days); longer cycles remain possible. There may be irregular bleeding (lighter, heavier, spotting). Dysfunctional uterine bleeding is often experienced by women approaching menopause due to the hormonal changes that accompany the menopause transition. Spotting or bleeding may simply be related to vaginal atrophy, a benign sore (polyp or lesion), or may be a functional endometrial response. The European Menopause and Andropause Society has released guidelines for assessment of the endometrium, which is usually the main source of spotting or bleeding.

In post-menopausal women, however, any unscheduled vaginal bleeding is of concern and requires an appropriate investigation to rule out the possibility of malignant diseases.

Urogenital symptoms that may appear during menopause and continue through postmenopause include:
 painful intercourse
 vaginal dryness
 atrophic vaginitis – thinning of the membranes of the vulva, the vagina, the cervix, and the outer urinary tract, along with considerable shrinking and loss in elasticity of all of the outer and inner genital areas.
 Urinary urgency and burning

Other physical effects

Other physical symptoms of menopause include lack of energy, joint soreness, stiffness, back pain, breast enlargement, breast pain,
heart palpitations, headache, dizziness, dry, itchy skin, thinning, tingling skin, rosacea, weight gain, urinary incontinence, urinary urgency, interrupted sleeping patterns, heavy night sweats, and hot flashes.

Mood and memory effects 
Psychological symptoms include anxiety, poor memory, inability to concentrate, depressive mood, irritability, mood swings, and less interest in sexual activity.

Menopause-related cognitive impairment can be confused with the mild cognitive impairment that precedes dementia. Tentative evidence has found that forgetfulness affects about half of menopausal women and is probably caused by the effects of declining estrogen levels on the brain, or perhaps by reduced blood flow to the brain during hot flashes.

Long-term effects

Cardiovascular health 
Exposure to endogenous estrogen during reproductive years provides women with protection against cardiovascular disease, which is lost around 10 years after the onset of menopause. The menopausal transition is associated with an increase in fat mass (predominantly in visceral fat), an increase in insulin resistance, dyslipidaemia, and endothelial dysfunction.  Women with vasomotor symptoms during menopause seem to have an especially unfavorable cardiometabolic profile, as well as women with premature onset of menopause (before 45 years of age). These risks can be reduced by managing risk factors, such as tobacco smoking, hypertension, increased blood lipids and body weight.

Bone health 
The annual rates of bone mineral density loss are highest starting one year before the final menstrual period and continuing through the two years after it. Thus, post menopausal women are at increased risk of osteopenia, osteoporosis and fractures.

Causes

Menopause can be induced or occur naturally. Induced menopause occurs as a result of medical treatment such as chemotherapy, radiotherapy, oophorectomy, or complications of tubal ligation, hysterectomy, unilateral or bilateral salpingo-oophorectomy or leuprorelin usage.

Age
Menopause typically occurs at some point between 47 and 54 years of age. According to various data, more than 95% of women have their last period between the ages of 44–56 (median 49–50).  2% of women under the age of 40, 5% between the ages of 40–45 and the same number between the ages of 55–58 have their last bleeding. The average age of the last period in the United States is 51 years, in Russia is 50 years, in Greece is 49 years, in Turkey is 47 years, in Egypt is 47 years and in India is 46 years. The menopausal transition or perimenopause leading up to menopause usually lasts 3–4 years (sometimes as long as 5–14 years).

In rare cases, a woman's ovaries stop working at a very early age, ranging anywhere from the age of puberty to age 40. This is known as premature ovarian failure and affects 1 to 2% of women by age 40.

Undiagnosed and untreated coeliac disease is a risk factor for early menopause. Coeliac disease can present with several non-gastrointestinal symptoms, in the absence of gastrointestinal symptoms, and most cases escape timely recognition and go undiagnosed, leading to a risk of long-term complications. A strict gluten-free diet reduces the risk. Women with early diagnosis and treatment of coeliac disease present a normal duration of fertile life span.

Women who have undergone hysterectomy with ovary conservation go through menopause on average 1.5 years earlier than the expected age. Another factor that can promote an earlier onset of menopause (usually 1 to 3 years early) is smoking cigarettes.

Premature ovarian insufficiency
Premature ovarian insufficiency (POI) is when the ovaries stop functioning before the age of 40 years. It is diagnosed or confirmed by high blood levels of follicle stimulating hormone (FSH) and luteinizing hormone (LH) on at least three occasions at least four weeks apart.

Premature ovarian insufficiency may be auto immune and therefore co occur with other autoimmune disorders such as thyroid disease, [adrenal insufficiency], and diabetes mellitus. Other causes include chemotherapy, being a carrier of the fragile X syndrome gene, and radiotherapy. However, in about 50–80% of cases of premature ovarian insufficiency, the cause is unknown, i.e., it is generally idiopathic.

An early menopause can be related to cigarette smoking, higher body mass index, racial and ethnic factors, illnesses, and the removal of the uterus.

Rates of premature menopause have been found to be significantly higher in fraternal and identical twins; approximately 5% of twins reach menopause before the age of 40. The reasons for this are not completely understood. Transplants of ovarian tissue between identical twins have been successful in restoring fertility.

Surgical menopause

Menopause can be surgically induced by bilateral oophorectomy (removal of ovaries), which is often, but not always, done in conjunction with removal of the Fallopian tubes (salpingo-oophorectomy) and uterus (hysterectomy). Cessation of menses as a result of removal of the ovaries is called "surgical menopause". Surgical treatments, such as the removal of ovaries, might cause periods to stop altogether. The sudden and complete drop in hormone levels may produce extreme withdrawal symptoms such as hot flashes, etc. The symptoms of early menopause may be more severe.

Removal of the uterus without removal of the ovaries does not directly cause menopause, although pelvic surgery of this type can often precipitate a somewhat earlier menopause, perhaps because of a compromised blood supply to the ovaries. The time between surgery and possible early menopause is due to the fact that ovaries are still producing hormones.

Mechanism

The menopausal transition, and postmenopause itself, is a natural change, not usually a disease state or a disorder. The main cause of this transition is the natural depletion and aging of the finite amount of oocytes (ovarian reserve). This process is sometimes accelerated by other conditions and is known to occur earlier after a wide range of gynecologic procedures such as hysterectomy (with and without ovariectomy), endometrial ablation and uterine artery embolisation. The depletion of the ovarian reserve causes an increase in circulating follicle-stimulating hormone (FSH) and luteinizing hormone (LH) levels because there are fewer oocytes and follicles responding to these hormones and producing estrogen.

The transition has a variable degree of effects.

The stages of the menopause transition have been classified according to a woman's reported bleeding pattern, supported by changes in the pituitary follicle-stimulating hormone (FSH) levels.

In younger women, during a normal menstrual cycle the ovaries produce estradiol, testosterone and progesterone in a cyclical pattern under the control of FSH and luteinizing hormone (LH), which are both produced by the pituitary gland. During perimenopause (approaching menopause), estradiol levels and patterns of production remain relatively unchanged or may increase compared to young women, but the cycles become frequently shorter or irregular. The often observed increase in estrogen is presumed to be in response to elevated FSH levels that, in turn, is hypothesized to be caused by decreased feedback by inhibin. Similarly, decreased inhibin feedback after hysterectomy is hypothesized to contribute to increased ovarian stimulation and earlier menopause.

The menopausal transition is characterized by marked, and often dramatic, variations in FSH and estradiol levels. Because of this, measurements of these hormones are not considered to be reliable guides to a woman's exact menopausal status.

Menopause occurs because of the sharp decrease of estradiol and progesterone production by the ovaries. After menopause, estrogen continues to be produced mostly by aromatase in fat tissues and is produced in small amounts in many other tissues such as ovaries, bone, blood vessels, and the brain where it acts locally. The substantial fall in circulating estradiol levels at menopause impacts many tissues, from brain to skin.

In contrast to the sudden fall in estradiol during menopause, the levels of total and free testosterone, as well as dehydroepiandrosterone sulfate (DHEAS) and androstenedione appear to decline more or less steadily with age. An effect of natural menopause on circulating androgen levels has not been observed. Thus specific tissue effects of natural menopause cannot be attributed to loss of androgenic hormone production.

Hot flashes and other vasomotor and body symptoms accompanying the menopausal transition are associated with estrogen insufficiency and changes that occur in the brain, primarily the hypothalamus and involve complex interplay between the neurotransmitters kisspeptin, neurokinin B, and dynorphin, which are found in KNDy neurons in the infundibular nucleus.

Long-term effects of menopause may include osteoporosis, vaginal atrophy as well as changed metabolic profile resulting in increased cardiac and metabolic disease (diabetes) risks.

Ovarian aging
Decreased inhibin feedback after hysterectomy is hypothesized to contribute to increased ovarian stimulation and earlier menopause. Hastened ovarian aging has been observed after endometrial ablation. While it is difficult to prove that these surgeries are causative, it has been hypothesized that the endometrium may be producing endocrine factors contributing to the endocrine feedback and regulation of the ovarian stimulation. Elimination of these factors contributes to faster depletion of the ovarian reserve. Reduced blood supply to the ovaries that may occur as a consequence of hysterectomy and uterine artery embolisation has been hypothesized to contribute to this effect.

Impaired DNA repair mechanisms may contribute to earlier depletion of the ovarian reserve during aging. As women age, double-strand breaks accumulate in the DNA of their primordial follicles. Primordial follicles are immature primary oocytes surrounded by a single layer of granulosa cells. An enzyme system is present in oocytes that ordinarily accurately repairs DNA double-strand breaks. This repair system is called "homologous recombinational repair", and it is especially effective during meiosis. Meiosis is the general process by which germ cells are formed in all sexual eukaryotes; it appears to be an adaptation for efficiently removing damages in germ line DNA.

Human primary oocytes are present at an intermediate stage of meiosis, termed prophase I (see Oogenesis). Expression of four key DNA repair genes that are necessary for homologous recombinational repair during meiosis (BRCA1, MRE11, Rad51, and ATM) decline with age in oocytes. This age-related decline in ability to repair DNA double-strand damages can account for the accumulation of these damages, that then likely contributes to the depletion of the ovarian reserve.

Diagnosis
Ways of assessing the impact on women of some of these menopause effects, include the Greene climacteric scale questionnaire, the Cervantes scale and the Menopause rating scale.

Premenopause
Premenopause is a term used to mean the years leading up to the last period, when the levels of reproductive hormones are becoming more variable and lower, and the effects of hormone withdrawal are present. Premenopause starts some time before the monthly cycles become noticeably irregular in timing.

Perimenopause
The term "perimenopause", which literally means "around the menopause", refers to the menopause transition years before the date of the final episode of flow. According to the North American Menopause Society, this transition can last for four to eight years. The Centre for Menstrual Cycle and Ovulation Research describes it as a six- to ten-year phase ending 12 months after the last menstrual period.

During perimenopause, estrogen levels average about 20–30% higher than during premenopause, often with wide fluctuations. These fluctuations cause many of the physical changes during perimenopause as well as menopause, especially during the last 1–2 years of perimenopause (before menopause). Some of these changes are hot flashes, night sweats, difficulty sleeping, mood swings, vaginal dryness or atrophy, incontinence, osteoporosis, and heart disease. Perimenopause is also associated with a higher likelihood of depression (affecting from 45 percent to 68 percent of perimenopausal women), which is twice as likely to affect those with a history of depression.

During this period, fertility diminishes but is not considered to reach zero until the official date of menopause. The official date is determined retroactively, once 12 months have passed after the last appearance of menstrual blood.

The menopause transition typically begins between 40 and 50 years of age (average 47.5). The duration of perimenopause may be for up to eight years. Women will often, but not always, start these transitions (perimenopause and menopause) about the same time as their mother did.

In some women, menopause may bring about a sense of loss related to the end of fertility. In addition, this change often occurs when other stressors may be present in a woman's life:
 Caring for, and/or the death of, elderly parents
 Empty nest syndrome when children leave home
 The birth of grandchildren, which places people of "middle age" into a new category of "older people" (especially in cultures where being older is a state that is looked down on)

Some research appears to show that melatonin supplementation in perimenopausal women can improve thyroid function and gonadotropin levels, as well as restoring fertility and menstruation and preventing depression associated with menopause.

Postmenopause
The term "postmenopausal" describes women who have not experienced any menstrual flow for a minimum of 12 months, assuming that they have a uterus and are not pregnant or lactating. In women without a uterus, menopause or postmenopause can be identified by a blood test showing a very high FSH level. Thus postmenopause is the time in a woman's life that takes place after her last period or, more accurately, after the point when her ovaries become inactive.

The reason for this delay in declaring postmenopause is that periods are usually erratic at this time of life. Therefore, a reasonably long stretch of time is necessary to be sure that the cycling has ceased. At this point a woman is considered infertile; however, the possibility of becoming pregnant has usually been very low (but not quite zero) for a number of years before this point is reached.

A woman's reproductive hormone levels continue to drop and fluctuate for some time into post-menopause, so hormone withdrawal effects such as hot flashes may take several years to disappear.

A period-like flow during postmenopause, even spotting, may be a sign of endometrial cancer.

Management
Perimenopause is a natural stage of life. It is not a disease or a disorder. Therefore, it does not automatically require any kind of medical treatment. However, in those cases where the physical, mental, and emotional effects of perimenopause are strong enough that they significantly disrupt the life of the woman experiencing them, palliative medical therapy may sometimes be appropriate.

Menopausal hormone therapy

In the context of the menopause, menopausal hormone therapy (MHT) is the use of estrogen in women without a uterus and estrogen plus progestogen in women who have an intact uterus.

MHT may be reasonable for the treatment of menopausal symptoms, such as hot flashes. It is the most effective treatment option, especially when delivered as a skin patch. Its use, however, appears to increase the risk of strokes and blood clots. When used for menopausal symptoms the global recommendation is MHT should be prescribed for a long as there are defined treatment effects and goals for the individual woman.

MHT is also effective for preventing bone loss and osteoporotic fracture, but it is generally recommended only for women at significant risk for whom other therapies are unsuitable.

MHT may be unsuitable for some women, including those at increased risk of cardiovascular disease, increased risk of thromboembolic disease (such as those with obesity or a history of venous thrombosis) or increased risk of some types of cancer. There is some concern that this treatment increases the risk of breast cancer. Women at increased risk of cardiometabolic disease and VTE may be able to use transdermal estradiol which does not appear to increase risks in low to moderate doses.

Adding testosterone to hormone therapy has a positive effect on sexual function in postmenopausal women, although it may be accompanied by hair growth, acne if used in excess. Transdermal testosterone therapy in appropriate dosing is generally safe

Selective estrogen receptor modulators
SERMs are a category of drugs, either synthetically produced or derived from a botanical source, that act selectively as agonists or antagonists on the estrogen receptors throughout the body. The most commonly prescribed SERMs are raloxifene and tamoxifen. Raloxifene exhibits oestrogen agonist activity on bone and lipids, and antagonist activity on breast and the endometrium. Tamoxifen is in widespread use for treatment of hormone sensitive breast cancer. Raloxifene prevents vertebral fractures in postmenopausal, osteoporotic women and reduces the risk of invasive breast cancer.

Other medications
Some of the SSRIs and SNRIs appear to provide some relief from vasomotor symptoms. Low dose paroxetine is the only non-hormonal medication that was FDA-approved to treat moderate-to-severe vasomotor symptoms associated with menopause as of 2016. They may, however, be associated with appetite and sleeping problems, constipation and nausea.

Gabapentin or clonidine may help but do not work as well as hormone therapy. Gabapentin can decrease the amount of hot flashes. Side effects associated with its use include drowsiness and headaches. Clonidine is used to improve vasomotor symptoms and may be associated with constipation, dizziness, nausea and sleeping problems.

Therapy 

One review found mindfulness and cognitive behavioural therapy decreases the amount women are affected by hot flashes. Another review found not enough evidence to make a conclusion. A 2018 study found that 85% of study participants reported reduced hot flashes and night sweats when using a climate control system in their beds.

Exercise 
Exercise has been thought to reduce postmenopausal symptoms through the increase of endorphin levels, which decrease as estrogen production decreases. Additionally, high BMI is a risk factor for vasomotor symptoms in particular. However, there is insufficient evidence to support the benefits of weight loss for symptom management. There are mixed perspectives on the benefits of physical exercise. While one review found that there was a lack of quality evidence supporting a benefit of exercise, another review recommended regular healthy exercise to reduce comorbidities, improve mood and anxiety symptoms, enhance cognition, and decrease the risk of fractures. Yoga may help with postmenopausal symptoms similar to other exercise. There is insufficient evidence to suggest that relaxation techniques reduce menopausal symptoms.

Alternative medicine
There is no evidence of consistent benefit of alternative therapies for menopausal symptoms despite their popularity.

The effect of soy isoflavones on menopausal symptoms is promising for reduction of hot flashes and vaginal dryness. Evidence does not support a benefit from phytoestrogens such as coumestrol, femarelle, or the non-phytoestrogen black cohosh. As of 2011 there is no support for herbal or dietary supplements in the prevention or treatment of the mental changes that occur around menopause.

Hypnosis may reduce the severity of hot flashes. In addition, relaxation training with at-home relaxation audiotapes such as deep breathing, paced respiration, and guided imagery may have positive effects on relaxing muscles and reducing stress.

There is no evidence to support the efficacy of acupuncture as a management for menopausal symptoms. A 2016 Cochrane review found not enough evidence to show a difference between Chinese herbal medicine and placebo for the vasomotor symptoms.

Other efforts
 Lack of lubrication is a common problem during and after perimenopause. Vaginal moisturizers can help women with overall dryness, and lubricants can help with lubrication difficulties that may be present during intercourse. It is worth pointing out that moisturizers and lubricants are different products for different issues: some women complain that their genitalia are uncomfortably dry all the time, and they may do better with moisturizers. Those who need only lubricants do well using them only during intercourse.
 Low-dose prescription vaginal estrogen products such as estrogen creams are generally a safe way to use estrogen topically, to help vaginal thinning and dryness problems (see vaginal atrophy) while only minimally increasing the levels of estrogen in the bloodstream.
 In terms of managing hot flashes, lifestyle measures such as drinking cold liquids, staying in cool rooms, using fans, removing excess clothing, and avoiding hot flash triggers such as hot drinks, spicy foods, etc., may partially supplement (or even obviate) the use of medications for some women.
 Individual counseling or support groups can sometimes be helpful to handle sad, depressed, anxious or confused feelings women may be having as they pass through what can be for some a very challenging transition time.
 Osteoporosis can be minimized by smoking cessation, adequate vitamin D intake and regular weight-bearing exercise. The bisphosphonate drug alendronate may decrease the risk of a fracture, in women that have both bone loss and a previous fracture and less so for those with just osteoporosis.
 A surgical procedure where a part of one of the ovaries is removed earlier in life and frozen and then over time thawed and returned to the body has been tried. While at least 11 women have undergone the procedure and paid over £6,000, there is no evidence it is safe or effective.

Society and culture

The cultural context within which a woman lives can have a significant impact on the way she experiences the menopausal transition. Menopause has been described as a subjective experience, with social and cultural factors playing a prominent role in the way menopause is experienced and perceived.

The word menopause was invented by French doctors at the beginning of the nineteenth century. Some of them noted that peasant women had no complaints about the end of menses, while urban middle-class women had many troubling symptoms. Doctors at this time considered the symptoms to be the result of urban lifestyles of sedentary behaviour, alcohol consumption, too much time indoors, and over-eating, with a lack of fresh fruit and vegetables.
Within the United States, social location affects the way women perceive menopause and its related biological effects. Research indicates that whether a woman views menopause as a medical issue or an expected life change is correlated with her socio-economic status. The paradigm within which a woman considers menopause influences the way she views it: Women who understand menopause as a medical condition rate it significantly more negatively than those who view it as a life transition or a symbol of aging.

Ethnicity and geography play roles in the experience of menopause. American women of different ethnicities report significantly different types of menopausal effects. One major study found Caucasian women most likely to report what are sometimes described as psychosomatic symptoms, while African-American women were more likely to report vasomotor symptoms.

It seems that Japanese women experience menopause effects, or konenki, in a different way from American women. Japanese women report lower rates of hot flashes and night sweats; this can be attributed to a variety of factors, both biological and social. Historically, konenki was associated with wealthy middle-class housewives in Japan, i.e., it was a "luxury disease" that women from traditional, inter-generational rural households did not report. Menopause in Japan was viewed as a symptom of the inevitable process of aging, rather than a "revolutionary transition", or a "deficiency disease" in need of management.

In Japanese culture, reporting of vasomotor symptoms has been on the increase, with research conducted in 2005 finding that of 140 Japanese participants, hot flashes were prevalent in 22.1%. This was almost double that of 20 years prior. Whilst the exact cause for this is unknown, possible contributing factors include significant dietary changes, increased medicalisation of middle-aged women and increased media attention on the subject. However, reporting of vasomotor symptoms is still significantly lower than North America.

Additionally, while most women in the United States apparently have a negative view of menopause as a time of deterioration or decline, some studies seem to indicate that women from some Asian cultures have an understanding of menopause that focuses on a sense of liberation and celebrates the freedom from the risk of pregnancy.
Diverging from these conclusions, one study appeared to show that many American women "experience this time as one of liberation and self-actualization".

Etymology
Menopause literally means the "end of monthly cycles" (the end of monthly periods or menstruation), from the Greek word pausis ("pause") and mēn ("month"). This is a medical coinage; the Greek word for menses is actually different. In Ancient Greek, the menses were described in the plural,  ("the monthlies"), and its modern descendant has been clipped to ta emmēna. The Modern Greek medical term is emmenopausis in Katharevousa or emmenopausi in Demotic Greek.

The word "menopause" was coined specifically for human females, where the end of fertility is traditionally indicated by the permanent stopping of monthly menstruations. However, menopause exists in some other animals, many of which do not have monthly menstruation; in this case, the term means a natural end to fertility that occurs before the end of the natural lifespan.

Menopause in popular culture 
In recent years celebrities have spoken out about their experiences of the menopause, which has led to it becoming less of a taboo as it has boosted awareness of the debilitating symptoms.

This has led to TV shows running features on the menopause to help women experiencing symptoms. In the UK Lorraine Kelly has been an advocate for getting women to speak about their experiences including sharing her own. This has led to an increase in women seeking treatment such as HRT

Evolutionary rationale

Few animals have a menopause: humans are joined by just four other species in which females live substantially longer than their ability to reproduce.  The others are all cetaceans: beluga whales, narwhals, orcas and short-finned pilot whales.  Various theories have been suggested that attempt to suggest evolutionary benefits to the human species stemming from the cessation of women's reproductive capability before the end of their natural lifespan. Explanations can be categorized as adaptive and non-adaptive:

Non-adaptive hypotheses

The high cost of female investment in offspring may lead to physiological deteriorations that amplify susceptibility to becoming infertile. This hypothesis suggests the reproductive lifespan in humans has been optimized, but it has proven more difficult in females and thus their reproductive span is shorter. If this hypothesis were true, however, age at menopause should be negatively correlated with the amount of energy expended to maintain the reproductive organs, and the available data does not support this.

A recent increase in female longevity due to improvements in the standard of living and social care has also been suggested. It is difficult for selection, however, to favor aid to offspring from parents and grandparents. Irrespective of living standards, adaptive responses are limited by physiological mechanisms. In other words, senescence is programmed and regulated by specific genes.

Early human selection shadow
While it is fairly common for extant hunter-gatherers to live past age 50 provided that they survive childhood, fossil evidence shows that mortality in adults has decreased over the last 30,000 to 50,000 years and that it was extremely unusual for early Homo sapiens to live to age 50. This discovery has led some biologists to argue that there was no selection for or against menopause at the time at which the ancestor of all modern humans lived in Africa, suggesting that menopause is instead a random evolutionary effect of a selection shadow regarding aging in early Homo sapiens. It is also argued that since the population fraction of post-menopausal women in early Homo sapiens was so low, menopause had no evolutionary effect on mate selection or social behaviors related to mate selection.

Adaptive hypotheses

"Survival of the fittest" hypothesis
This hypothesis suggests that younger mothers and offspring under their care will fare better in a difficult and predatory environment because a younger mother will be stronger and more agile in providing protection and sustenance for herself and a nursing baby. The various biological factors associated with menopause had the effect of male members of the species investing their effort with the most viable of potential female mates.

A problem with this hypothesis is that, if true, we would expect to see menopause exhibited among many species in the animal kingdom, and another problem is that in the case of extended child development, even a female who was relatively young, still agile, and attractive when producing a child would lose future support from her male partner due to him seeking out fertile mates when she reaches menopause, while the child is still not independent. This would be counterproductive to the supposed adaptation of getting male support, as it would significantly decrease the survival for children produced over much of the female's fertile and agile life, unless children were raised in ways that did not rely on support from a male partner, which would eliminate the supposed evolutionary benefit anyway.

Young female preference hypothesis 
The young female preference hypothesis proposes that changes in male preferences for younger mates allowed late-age acting fertility mutations to accumulate in females without any evolutionary penalty, giving rise to menopause. A computer model was constructed to test this hypothesis, and showed that it was feasible.  However, in order for deleterious mutations that affect fertility past roughly age fifty to accumulate, human maximum lifespan had to first be extended to about its present value. As of 2016 it was unclear if there has been sufficient time since that happened for such an evolutionary process to occur.

Male-biased philopatry hypothesis 
The male-biased philopatry theory proposes that if human social groups were originally based around men leaving their birth communities more frequently than women, then this leads to increased relatedness to the group in relation to female age, making inclusive fitness benefits older females receive from helping the group greater than what they would receive from continued reproduction, which in turn eventually led to the evolution of menopause. In a pattern of male-biased dispersal and local mating, the relatedness of the individuals in the group decreases with female age, leading to a decrease in kin selection with female age. This occurs because a female will stay with her father in her birth community throughout life, initially being closely related to the males and females. Females are born and stay in the group, so relatedness to the females stays about the same. However, throughout time, the older male relatives will die and any sons she gives birth to will disperse, so that local relatedness to males, and therefore the whole group, declines. The situation is reversed in species where males are philopatric and either females disperse, or mating is non-local. Under these conditions, a female's reproductive life begins away from her father and paternal relatives because she was either born into a new group from non-local mating or because she dispersed. In the case of female-biased dispersal, the female is initially equally unrelated with every individual in the group, and with non-local mating, the female is closely related to the females of the group, but not the males since her paternal relatives are in another group. As she gives birth, her sons will stay with her, increasing her relatedness to males in the group over time and thus her relatedness with the overall group. The common feature that connects these two otherwise different behaviors is male-biased philopatry, which leads to an increase in kin selection with female age.

While not conclusive, evidence does exist to support the idea that female-biased dispersal existed in pre-modern humans. The closest living relatives to humans, chimpanzees, bonobos, and both mountain gorillas and western lowland gorillas, are female-biased dispersers. Analysis of sex specific genetic material, the non-recombining portions of the Y chromosome and mitochondrial DNA, show evidence of a prevalence of female-biased dispersal as well; however, these results could also be affected by the effective breeding numbers of males and females in local populations. Evidence of female-biased dispersion in hunter-gatherers is not definitive, with some studies supporting the idea, and others suggesting there is no strong bias towards either sex. In orcas, both sexes mate non-locally with members of a different pod but return to the pod after copulation. Demographic data shows that a female's mean relatedness to the group does increase over time due to increasing relatedness to males. While less well-studied, there is evidence that short-finned pilot whales, another menopausal species, also display this behavior. However, mating behavior that increases local relatedness with female age is prevalent in non-menopausal species, making it unlikely that it is the only factor that determines if menopause will evolve in a species.

Mother hypothesis

The mother hypothesis suggests that menopause was selected for humans because of the extended development period of human offspring and high costs of reproduction so that mothers gain an advantage in reproductive fitness by redirecting their effort from new offspring with a low survival chance to existing children with a higher survival chance.

Grandmother hypothesis

The Grandmother hypothesis suggests that menopause was selected for humans because it promotes the survival of grandchildren. According to this hypothesis, post-reproductive women feed and care for children, adult nursing daughters, and grandchildren whose mothers have weaned them. Human babies require large and steady supplies of glucose to feed the growing brain. In infants in the first year of life, the brain consumes 60% of all calories, so both babies and their mothers require a dependable food supply. Some evidence suggests that hunters contribute less than half the total food budget of most hunter-gatherer societies, and often much less than half, so that foraging grandmothers can contribute substantially to the survival of grandchildren at times when mothers and fathers are unable to gather enough food for all of their children. In general, selection operates most powerfully during times of famine or other privation. So although grandmothers might not be necessary during good times, many grandchildren cannot survive without them during times of famine.

Post-reproductive female orcas tend to lead their pods, especially during years of food scarcity. Furthermore, the increased mortality risk of an orca due to losing a grandmother is stronger in years of food scarcity

Analysis of historical data found that the length of a female's post-reproductive lifespan was reflected in the reproductive success of her offspring and the survival of her grandchildren. Another study found comparative effects but only in the maternal grandmother—paternal grandmothers had a detrimental effect on infant mortality (probably due to paternity uncertainty). Differing assistance strategies for maternal and paternal grandmothers have also been demonstrated. Maternal grandmothers concentrate on offspring survival, whereas paternal grandmothers increase birth rates.

Some believe variations on the mother, or grandmother effect fail to explain longevity with continued spermatogenesis in males (oldest verified paternity is 94 years, 35 years beyond the oldest documented birth attributed to females). Notably, the survival time past menopause is roughly the same as the maturation time for a human child. That a mother's presence could aid in the survival of a developing child, while an unidentified father's absence might not have affected survival, could explain the paternal fertility near the end of the father's lifespan.  A man with no certainty of which children are his may merely attempt to father additional children, with support of existing children present but small. Note the existence of partible paternity supporting this. Some argue that the mother and grandmother hypotheses fail to explain the detrimental effects of losing ovarian follicular activity, such as osteoporosis, osteoarthritis, Alzheimer's disease and coronary artery disease.

The theories discussed above assume that evolution directly selected for menopause. Another theory states that menopause is the byproduct of the evolutionary selection for follicular atresia, a factor that causes menopause. Menopause results from having too few ovarian follicles to produce enough estrogen to maintain the ovarian-pituitary-hypothalamic loop, which results in the cessation of menses and the beginning of menopause. Human females are born with approximately a million oocytes, and approximately 400 oocytes are lost to ovulation throughout life.

Reproductive conflict hypothesis 
In social vertebrates, the sharing of resources among the group places limits on how many offspring can be produced and supported by members of the group. This creates a situation in which each female must compete with others of the group to ensure they are the one that reproduces. The reproductive conflict hypothesis proposes that this female reproductive conflict favors the cessation of female reproductive potential in older age to avoid reproductive conflict, increasing the older female's fitness through inclusive benefits. Female-biased dispersal or non-local mating leads to an increase in relatedness to the social group with female age. In the human case of female-biased dispersal, when a young female enters a new group, she is not related to any individual and she reproduces to produce an offspring with a relatedness of 0.5. An older female could also choose to reproduce, producing an offspring with a relatedness of 0.5, or she could refrain from reproducing and allow another pair to reproduce. Because her relatedness to males in the group is high, there is a fair probability that the offspring will be her grandchild with a relatedness of 0.25. The younger female experiences no cost to her inclusive fitness from using the resources necessary to successfully rear offspring since she is not related to members of the group, but there is a cost for the older female. As a result, the younger female has the advantage in reproductive competition. Although a female orca born into a social group is related to some members of the group, the whale case of non-local mating leads to similar outcomes because the younger female relatedness to the group as a whole is less than the relatedness of the older female. This behavior makes more likely the cessation of reproduction late in life to avoid reproductive conflict with younger females.

Research using both human and orca demographic data has been published that supports the role of reproductive conflict in the evolution of menopause. Analysis of demographic data from pre-industrial Finnish populations found significant reductions in offspring survivorship when mothers-in-laws and daughters-in-laws had overlapping births, supporting the idea that avoiding reproductive conflict is beneficial to offspring survivorship. Humans, more so than other primates, rely on food sharing for survival, so the large survivorship reduction values could be caused by a straining of community resources. Avoiding such straining is a possible explanation for why the reproductive overlap seen in humans is much lower than other primates. Food sharing is also prevalent among another menopausal species, orcas. Reproductive conflict has also been observed in orcas, with increased calf mortality seen when reproductive overlap between a younger and older generational female occurred.

Other animals

Menopause in the animal kingdom appears to be uncommon, but the presence of this phenomenon in different species has not been thoroughly researched. Life histories show a varying degree of senescence; rapid senescing organisms (e.g., Pacific salmon and annual plants) do not have a post-reproductive life-stage. Gradual senescence is exhibited by all placental mammalian life histories.

Menopause has been observed in several species of nonhuman primates, including rhesus monkeys and chimpanzees. Some research suggests that wild chimpanzees do not experience menopause, as their fertility declines are associated with declines in overall health. Menopause also has been reported in a variety of other vertebrate species including elephants, short-finned pilot whales, orcas, narwhals, beluga whales, and the guppy. However, with the exception of the short-finned pilot whale, killer whale, narwhals, and beluga whales, such examples tend to be from captive individuals, and thus they are not necessarily representative of what happens in natural populations in the wild.

Dogs do not experience menopause; the canine estrus cycle simply becomes irregular and infrequent. Although older female dogs are not considered good candidates for breeding, offspring have been produced by older animals. Similar observations have been made in cats.

See also 
 European Menopause and Andropause Society
 Menopause in the workplace
 Menopause in incarceration
 Pregnancy over age 50
 Biological clock

References

External links 

 Menopause: MedlinePlus
 Menopause and Menopause Treatments

 
Developmental stages
Endocrinology
Menstrual cycle
Middle age
Senescence
Wikipedia medicine articles ready to translate
Human female endocrine system